The list of EuroLeague-winning head coaches shows all of the head coaches that have won the EuroLeague championship. The EuroLeague is the European-wide top-tier level professional basketball club competition. The competition was originally called the FIBA European Champions Cup, or simply European Champions Cup.

Key

List

Multiple winners 
The following is a list of head coaches with multiple EuroLeague titles. Number in parentheses indicates how many title are won by a one club.

Winners by country
The following is a list of current countries where head coaches came from. Number in parentheses indicates how many title are won by a single coach, if there are more than one.

See also 
 Alexander Gomelsky EuroLeague Coach of the Year
 List of EuroCup-winning head coaches
 List of European Cup and UEFA Champions League winning managers

References

External links
 

Winning coaches